Sefer Emini (born 15 July 2000) is a Macedonian football player. He plays for Danish club SønderjyskE.

Club career

Makedonija Gj. P. and Akron
First professional league debut was on 26 May 2019 against FK Pobeda ,come from the bench on the 53 minute. FC Akron sign Sefer Emini for 80.000 euro from FK Makedonija GP on 16 October 2020. He made his debut in the Russian Football National League for FC Akron Tolyatti on 7 November 2020 in a game against PFC Krylia Sovetov Samara.

Return to Makedonija Gj. P.

Period on loan

Return as a permanent player

References

External links
 Profile by Russian Football National League
 

2000 births
Living people
Macedonian footballers
Macedonian expatriate footballers
North Macedonia youth international footballers
North Macedonia under-21 international footballers
Association football midfielders
FC Akron Tolyatti players
FK Makedonija Gjorče Petrov players
SønderjyskE Fodbold players
Macedonian First Football League players
Russian First League players
Danish 1st Division players
Macedonian expatriate sportspeople in Russia
Macedonian expatriate sportspeople in Denmark
Expatriate footballers in Russia
Expatriate men's footballers in Denmark